The Statue of Liberty (Greek: Άγαλμα της Ελευθερίας) is a bronze statue erected at the harbor of Mytilene on the island of Lesbos in Greece.

The statue was created by Greek sculptor Gregorios Zevgolis based on a design by local painter Georgios Jakobides.  It was cast in Germany in 1922, and was erected and dedicated in Mytilene in 1930.

References

Monuments and memorials in Greece
Sculptures of women in Greece
Statues in Greece
1922 sculptures
Buildings and structures in Lesbos
Liberty symbols